Naphazoline/pheniramine, sold under the brand name Naphcon-A among others, is a combination eye drop used to help the symptoms of allergic conjunctivitis such as from hay fever. It contains naphazoline and pheniramine. It is used as an eye drop. Use is not recommended for more than three days.

Side effects may include allergic reactions, eye pain, and dilated pupils. It is unclear if use in pregnancy is safe. Nephazoline works by resulting in constriction of blood vessels thus decreasing redness while pheniramine works by blocking the effects of histamine to stop itching.

The combination was approved for medical use in the United States in 1994. It is available over the counter. In 2017, it was the 203rd most commonly prescribed medication in the United States, with more than two million prescriptions.

Medical use
It is administered topically with one to two drops applied to the affected eye(s) up to four times daily.

Adverse effects

 Pupils may become enlarged temporarily
 Overuse may cause more redness
 Those with heart disease, high blood pressure, narrow angle glaucoma or who have urination trouble are discouraged from using the product
 It is recommended to remove contact lenses before use. Use with contact lenses can lead to reduced oxygenation of the underlying cornea
 If infants or children accidentally ingest the drops, it may lead to coma and significant reduction in body temperature. If such ingestion occurs, immediately calling a poison control center is recommended

References

External links 
 

Wikipedia medicine articles ready to translate
Ophthalmology drugs
Combination drugs
Alcon brands